656 Beagle, provisional designation , is an asteroid from the outer regions of the asteroid belt, approximately  in diameter. It was discovered on 22 January 1908, by German astronomer August Kopff at the Heidelberg Observatory. It is the principal body and namesake of the small Beagle cluster located within the Themis family. The C-type asteroid is likely highly elongated and has a rotation period of 7.0 hours. It was named for Charles Darwin's ship, .

Orbit and classification 

Beagle is the principal body and namesake of the Beagle cluster, a small asteroid family of less than 150 known members, located within the much larger Themis family of carbonaceous asteroids, which is named after 24 Themis. It orbits the Sun in the outer main-belt at a distance of 2.7–3.6 AU once every 5 years and 7 months (2,042 days; semi-major axis of 3.15 AU). Its orbit has an eccentricity of 0.13 and an inclination of 1° with respect to the ecliptic.

Naming 

This minor planet was named after , with which naturalist Charles Darwin sailed around the world from 1831 to 1836. The official naming citation was mentioned in The Names of the Minor Planets by Paul Herget in 1955.

Physical characteristics 

In the SDSS-based taxonomy, Beagle is a carbonaceous C-type asteroid, in line with the overall spectral type of the Beagle and Themis family.

Rotation period 

In April 2004, a rotational lightcurve of Beagle was obtained from photometric observations by John Menke at the Menke Observatory. Lightcurve analysis gave a rotation period of  hours with a very high brightness amplitude of 1.2 magnitude, indicative of a non-spherical, elongated shape.

Diameter and albedo 

According to the survey carried out by the NEOWISE mission of NASA's Wide-field Infrared Survey Explorer, Beagle measures 62.6 kilometers in diameter and its surface has an albedo of 0.045. The Collaborative Asteroid Lightcurve Link adopts the SIMPS albedo of 0.0625 and a diameter of 53.17 kilometers based on an absolute magnitude of 10.0.

References

External links 
 Asteroid Lightcurve Database (LCDB), query form (info )
 Dictionary of Minor Planet Names, Google books
 Asteroids and comets rotation curves, CdR – Observatoire de Genève, Raoul Behrend
 Discovery Circumstances: Numbered Minor Planets (1)-(5000) – Minor Planet Center
 
 

000656
000656
Discoveries by August Kopff
Named minor planets
19080122